William Aitken or Bill Aitken may refer to:

 William Aitken (politician) (1903–1964), journalist and politician
 William Aitken (footballer) (1894–1973), Scottish soccer player
 William Alexander Aitken (1785–1851), fur trader with the Ojibwe
 William Aubrey Aitken (1911–1985), second Bishop of Lynn, 1972–1986
 William Aitken (pathologist) (1825–1892), Scottish pathologist
 Bill Aitken (politician) (born 1947), Scottish politician
 Bill Aitken (writer) (born 1934), Scottish-born writer and traveller, long a citizen and resident of India